Frank Simon Armi Jr (12 October 1918 in Portland, Oregon – 28 November 1992 in Watsonville, California) was an American racecar driver. Armi's racing career ended in the mid-1960s, when he became a television and film sound engineer, specialising in the role of sound technician, including the film The 3rd Voice, starring Edmond O'Brien and Julie London.

He worked for Universal Pictures for over twenty-five years. He also served in World War II and ran an auto parts shop.

Indy 500 results

World Championship career summary
The Indianapolis 500 was part of the FIA World Championship from 1950 through 1960. Drivers competing at Indy during those years were credited with World Championship points and participation. Frank Armi participated in 1 World Championship race. He started on the pole 0 times, won 0 races, set 0 fastest laps, and finished on the podium 0 times. He accumulated a total of 0 championship points.

Complete Formula One World Championship results
(key)

References

1918 births
1992 deaths
Indianapolis 500 drivers
Racing drivers from Portland, Oregon